Talle Valley Wildlife Sanctuary is a protected area in Arunachal Pradesh, India, with an area of . It was established in 1995.
It is also known as Talley Valley Wildlife Sanctuary.
Mammal species present include clouded leopard (Neofelis nebulosa), Malayan giant squirrel (Ratufa bicolor), Indian muntjac (Muntiacus muntjak) and Asian palm civet (Paradoxurus hermaphroditus). The 130 bird species observed in spring 2015 included black eagle (Ictinaetus malayensis), collared owlet (Glaucidium brodiei), golden-breasted fulvetta (Lioparus chrysotis), scarlet minivet (Pericrocotus speciosus), Verditer flycatcher (Eumyias thalassinus) and Mrs. Gould's sunbird (Aethopyga gouldiae).

Flora 
There are about 16 endangered plants that have survived in this area, they are: Panax sikkimensis, Schizandre, Acer hookeri, Acer oblongum, Goleola neediflora, Angioteris evecta, Cyathia spinulosa, Monotropa uniflora, Clematis apiculata, Corybus spp., Goleola falconeri, Balanphora dioica, Lilium grandiflora, Pleioblastu simonii, Berberis spp., Cotoneaster species.

References

External links 

Wildlife sanctuaries in Arunachal Pradesh
Protected areas established in 1995
1995 establishments in Arunachal Pradesh